Ganslernhang (short: Ganslern) is a men's classic slalom World Cup ski course in Kitzbühel, Austria, competing for Hahnenkamm Races since 1937.

It is located on the Hahnenkamm mountain (Kitzbühel Alps) in Kitzbühel, Tyrol, right next to even more famous "Streif" downhill course.

The record holder for the most wins on this course is the Swede, Ingemar Stenmark, who won five slalom races here. It was also here that, in 2022, that Dave Ryding became the first Briton to win a world cup ski championship.

With average of 25,000 people annually, is the second most visited SL in the circuit, behind Schladming.

History 
From 1931 to 1936 the championship was held on nearby courses "Hahnenkamm" and "Ehrenbachhöhe". Since its premiere in 1937, the Hahnenkamm slalom has been held on this course (Ganslern).

In 1954, by exception, no Hahnenkamm Trophy was awarded, they were competing on the so-called "Vorderganslern" at Austrian International Winter Sports III competition.

Even before the introduction of the World Cup in 1967 it was one of the annual fixtures in FIS's racing calendar. In 1964, 1988 and 1993 the slaloms were cancelled and held elsewhere.

In 1971, the downhill was cancelled and replaced with giant slalom which for the first and last time together with slalom counted for classic Hahnenkamm combined. An additional SL was also held.

In 1998 and 2007 additional slaloms were held on this course, replacing other cancelled venues on the so-called "Vorderganslern" to the finish line of the "Streif".

In 2007 and 2008 this route was chosen again due to the high number of spectators. In 2009 it returned again to the traditional Ganslernhang course.

(pre)World Cup

Men 

GS in 1950s and 1960s didn't count for Hahnenkamm combined. And in 1970 did together with SL (dowhnill cancelled)

Women

Course 
The slope has numerous changes of terrain and lies at an oblique angle making it one of, if not the hardest and most challenging slalom course in the World Cup, located next to the final straight of the Streif.

It has its own finishing arena. The name "Ganslernhang" comes from a farmstead that stood there until 1993 and took its name from a stream, the Gänsbach, which flowed past it.

In 2009, before relatively short course, was lengthened by moving start higher up in the hill, at the same time new lift was built, with more comfortable standing area.

Sections 
Goasweg, Steilhang, Doppelwelle, Querfahrt, Stadl Kurve, Talei

Club5+ 
In 1986, elite Club5 was originally founded by prestigious classic downhill organizers: Kitzbühel, Wengen, Garmisch, Val d’Isère and Val Gardena/Gröden, with goal to bring alpine ski sport on the highest levels possible.

Later over the years other classic longterm organizers joined the now named Club5+: Alta Badia, Cortina, Kranjska Gora, Maribor, Lake Louise, Schladming, Adelboden, Kvitfjell, St.Moritz and Åre.

References

External links 
 Hahnenkamm racing 
 Alle Weltcupslaloms in Kitzbühel auf fis-ski.com 

Alpine skiing in Austria
Kitzbühel
Kitzbühel Alps
Sports venues in Tyrol (state)
Skiing in Austria